The national anthem of Slovenia is based on "Zdravljica" , a carmen figuratum poem by the 19th-century Romantic Slovene poet France Prešeren, inspired by the ideals of Liberté, égalité, fraternité, and set to music by Stanko Premrl. As the country's national anthem, it is one of the state symbols of Slovenia.

History

Background
Historically, the national anthem from 1860 until the beginning of the 1990s, was "Naprej, zastava slave" ("Forward, Flag of Glory"), the first ever piece of Slovene literature to be translated into English.

Lyrics and music 
The words of the current Slovene national anthem are all or part of "Zdravljica", written by the 19th-century Slovene poet France Prešeren for which music was written by the Slovene composer Stanko Premrl in 1905.  Emphasising internationalism, it was defined in 1994 as the anthem with the Act on the national symbols of Slovenia.  However, even before the breakup of Yugoslavia, the lyrics and music were together adopted as the regional anthem of the Socialist Republic of Slovenia on 27 September 1989. Therefore, it was the regional anthem of the Socialist Republic of Slovenia (known as simply the "Republic of Slovenia" from 1990 to 1991) as a constituent republic of Yugoslavia from 8 March 1990 to 25 June 1991, as well.

Legal status
As a work of arts, published in the official journal Official Gazette, the text and melody of the seventh stanza of "Zdravljica" qualify as an official work and are per Article 9 of the Slovene Copyright and Related Rights Act not protected by the copyrights. Their usage is regulated by the Act Regulating the Coat-of-Arms, Flag and Anthem of the Republic of Slovenia and the Flag of the Slovene Nation, published in the Official Gazette in 1994. The official melody is played in B-flat major.

Lyrics

Notes

References

External links

Anthem of the Slovenian Armed Forces. Music and lyrics. Themarches09. YouTube. 3 August 2010. Retrieved 3 March 2012.

Anthems of Slovenia
European anthems
National anthems
National anthem compositions in B-flat major